Nekgini, one of the Finisterre languages of Papua New Guinea, is spoken in a single village in Madang Province.

References

Finisterre languages
Languages of Madang Province